Roanoke Municipal Airport  is two miles south of Roanoke, in Randolph County, Alabama. The FAA's National Plan of Integrated Airport Systems for 2009–2013 categorized it as a general aviation facility.

Facilities
Its single runway, 11/29, is 3,697 by 80 feet (1,127 x 24 m) asphalt.

In the year ending March 17, 2009 the airport had 3,116 aircraft operations, average 259 per month, all general aviation. 16 aircraft were then based at this airport: 94% single-engine and 6% ultralight.

References

External links 
 Aerial image as of 7 March 1997 from USGS The National Map
 Airfield photos for 7A5 from Civil Air Patrol

Airports in Alabama
Transportation buildings and structures in Randolph County, Alabama